Tri života (English translation: Three Lives) is the eighteenth studio album by Bosnian Serb singer Mile Kitić. It was his second album to be produced and released by the label Grand Production.

Track listing

References

1999 albums
Mile Kitić albums
Grand Production albums